The Indian locomotive class WCM-2 is a class of 1.5 kV DC electric locomotives that was developed in 1956 by Vulcan Foundry and English Electric for Indian Railways. The model name stands for broad gauge (W), Direct Current (C), Mixed traffic (M) engine, 2nd generation (2). They entered service in 1957. A total of 12 WCM-2 locomotives were built in England between 1956 and 1957.

The WCM-2 served both passenger and freight trains for over 43 years. With the introduction of more modern types of locomotives and 25 KV AC electrification, all were withdrawn in the early 2000s after repeated failures. All locomotives of this class have since been scrapped.

History 

The history of WCM-2 begins in the mid 1950s with the stated aim of the Indian Railways (IR) to remove steam locomotives working on the Eastern Railway (ER) after recommendation of Karnail Singh Fuel Committee. In the late 1950s the Kolkata Suburban Railway was established and electrified with overhead 3000V DC supply. So Indian Railways began to look at various designs.

Initially, Indian railways invited tenders to build locomotives to the new specification. The following responses were received:

 Vulcan Foundry and English Electric submitted their model with 3120 hp with top speed of 105 km/h.
Hitachi submitted their model with 3600 hp with top speed of 105 km/h. They also had Co-Co bogies

Each company submitted their prototypes and Indian Railways designated these prototypes as the WCM-2 class and WCM-3 class respectively.

So Indian Railways decided to procure 7 3000 V DC electric locomotives from English Electric and Vulcan Foundry, the latter previously supplied Steam locomotives to India. They are manufactured in England and shipped to India in 1956-1957. These locomotives were the second mixed class electric locomotive to roam India and also had now common Co-Co wheel arrangement.  Initially the WCM-2 class were known as EM/2 class. They were easily recognizable with their huge size and round smooth noses. They had their cab doors placed near the cab unlike the WCM-1 class.

The WCM-2 were first used on trains in the Kolkata suburban section and a black livery with a red lining in the middle. But by 1960 the Kolkata Suburban Railway was converted to 25,000 V AC, so the 5 and 4 year old WCM-2 units were rendered unusable. So Research Design and Standards Organisation (RDSO) decided to converted the quite new locomotives to run on the 1500V DC Power supply used in Central Railway (CR) without loss of power.

They began their CR zone service in 1961. The WCM-2 locomotives were used on many Express trains like the Deccan Queen, Indrayani Express etc, but rarely used on Freight service. In the mid 1990s the aging WCM-2s began to fail regularly causing disruption on train services. So Central Railways decided to withdraw these locomotives from service and by 2000, all units were withdrawn.

Former sheds 

 Pune
 Kalyan (KYN)
  All the locomotives of this class has been withdrawn from service.

See also

Rail transport in India#History
Indian Railways
Locomotives of India
Rail transport in India

References

External links

http://www.irfca.org/faq/faq-specs.html#WCM-2

India railway fan club

Electric locomotives of India
1500 V DC locomotives
Co-Co locomotives
Railway locomotives introduced in 1961
5 ft 6 in gauge locomotives
English Electric locomotives
Vulcan Foundry locomotives